The Istanbul Marathon (also known as N Kolay Istanbul Marathon for sponsorship reasons) is an international athletics event hosted in Istanbul, Turkey, in November, first held in 1979.  It is the only marathon in the world whose course spans two continents, Asia and Europe.

The three race categories for men and women are: marathon, 15 km and public run. A special category for disabled persons exists also. Participation in the public run was with 150,000 people a record set in 1998.

The event is organised by Istanbul Sports Events, which also hosts the annual Istanbul Half Marathon in April.

History

The Istanbul marathon has previously been known as "Vodafone Istanbul Marathon" as well as "Intercontinental Istanbul Eurasia Marathon".

In 1997, Moges Taye of Ethiopia set the course record for men at the time of 2:13:37.

In 2005, Madina Biktagirova of Russia set the course record for women at the time of 2:34:25.

In 2006, Madina Biktagirova broke her own course record for women from the previous year with 2:28:21, and the course record for men was broken by the Lithuanian athlete Mindaugas Pukstas in 2:12:52.  Also, for the first time in 2006, time keeping for marathon and 15 km was effected by means of a single-use chip, which was placed on the athlete's shoe tied by shoelaces.  An athlete without this so-called champion-chip would not receive an official time.  In addition, the Istanbul Eurasia Marathon that year incorporated the 4th European Police Marathon Championships for the first time, which contributed to top results.

In 2012, the month the marathon was generally held was changed from October to November.  That year, the 34th edition of the marathon was named "Vodafone Istanbul Eurasia Marathon".  Also that year, because the marathon had become a significant marathon event, it was awarded IAAF Gold Label status.

In 2013, around 20,000 local and foreigner athletes participated at the road race in different categories, among them wheelchair runners. The event saw also for the first time security measures concerning the bridge stability. Two years before, the running crowd on the Bosphorus Bridge caused dangerous instability by self-induced vibrations in the structure which could result in its failure. Influenced by this lesson, several start times with ten minutes intervals were held after the first start, which took place on 9:30 hours. The groups were not allowed to run on the bridge rather than to walk only. In order to avoid stopping for taking pictures, the outmost lanes of the bridge were blocked by barriers.

Course 

The course is asphalt, mostly flat and is free of traffic. It is the only course in the world where the marathon includes two continents, Asia and Europe, in one race.

The marathon starts on the Asian side of the city, shortly before the First Bosphorus Bridge, crosses the bridge giving an outstanding view of the Bosphorus and Istanbul, passes many historic sites including the Blue Mosque and Hagia Sophia, and ends in the İnönü Stadium in the European part. In all, the race crosses three bridges, one over the Bosporus and two over the Golden Horn. The course changed three times over the years, therefore winning scores differ.

In 2020, during the coronavirus pandemic, the course was altered to begin and end in Yenikapı and cross the Bosphorus Bridge twice, so runners would start and finish the marathon in Europe, but both enter and exit Asia during the run.

Qualification 

To register for the marathon, participants must be 18 years of age or older on the race day.

In 2020, due to the coronavirus pandemic, athletes over the age of 65 were disallowed from participating in the marathon.

Prizes 
Money prizes are given to the first 25 male athletes and 15 best female athletes in the marathon category, the first 3 ranks receiving US$35,000, US$15,000 and US$10,000 respectively. An athlete, who broke the course record, is awarded with a bonus of US$5,000. Bonuses exists also for times run between 2:14:00 and 2:04:55 or better for men and between 2:33:00 and 2:15:25 or better for women, scaled from US$500 up to US$100,000. Prizes are also provided for the best ranking athletes in other competition categories.

In 2013, the total amount of the money prizes was US$1 million.

Winners 

Key: Course record (in bold)

By country

Recent results
2016
38th marathon was held on November 13, 2016

2015
37th marathon was held on November 15, 2015.

Prize money (both for men and women):
Winners: US$50,000
Runner-up: US$25,000
Third place: US$15,000

2014
36th marathon was held on November 16, 2014.

2013
35th marathon was held on November 17, 2013.

NB Original race winner Abraham Kiprotich was disqualified for a doping offence.

2012
34th marathon was held on November 11, 2012.

2011
33rd marathon was held on October 16, 2011.

2010
32nd marathon was held on October 17, 2010.

2009
31st marathon was held on October 18, 2009.

Awards:
Winner men's: US$50,000
Winner women's: US$50,000

2008
30th marathon was held on October 26, 2008.

†)  Course changed

Prize money:
Winner men's: US$60,000
Winner women's: US$60,000
Course record: US$10,000
World record: US$100,000

2007
29th marathon was held on October 28, 2007.
Motto: "Sağlıklı Çevre, Sağlıklı Nesiller, Yaşanabilir Bir Kent" (Healthy Environment, Healthy Generations)

Awards:
Winner men's: US$60,000
Winner women's: US$60,000
Course record: US$10,000
World record: US$100,000

2006
28th marathon was held on November 5, 2006.
Motto: "Sigarasız Bir Dünya İçin Koşuyoruz" (Smoke-Free
World)

2005
27th marathon was held on October 2, 2005.

2004
26th marathon was held on October 10, 2004.

2003
25th marathon was held on October 19, 2003.

2002
24th marathon was held on October 27, 2002.

2001
23rd marathon was held on October 11, 2001.

2000
22nd marathon was held on October 14, 2000.

 CRM Course record Men's
 CRW Course record Women's
 FCRM Former Course record Men's
 FCRW Former Course record Women's

Notable participants
  Ian Thompson in 1983
  Mehmet Terzi in 1985
  Terry Mitchell in 1991 and 1992
  Elvan Abeylegesse in 2013

Notes

References

External links
 Official Web site of the Eurasia Marathon
 Statistics Eurasia Marathon
 Marathon Info

Recurring sporting events established in 1979
Marathons in Turkey
Sport in Istanbul
1979 establishments in Turkey
Annual sporting events in Turkey
Autumn events in Turkey